Thamnosophis lateralis, commonly known as the lateral water snake, is a species of snake in the family Pseudoxyrhophiidae. It is endemic to Madagascar.

References 

Pseudoxyrhophiidae
Snakes of Africa
Reptiles of Madagascar
Endemic fauna of Madagascar
Reptiles described in 1854
Taxa named by André Marie Constant Duméril
Taxa named by Gabriel Bibron
Taxa named by Auguste Duméril